Middle Kids is the debut extended play by Australian alternative-indie rock band Middle Kids. It was released in February 2017 and peaked at number 26 on the ARIA Charts.

Track listing

Charts

Release history

References

2017 debut EPs
Middle Kids EPs
Universal Music Australia EPs